Nikita Leonidovich Morgunov (born June 29, 1975) is a Russian former professional basketball player. He represented the Russian national basketball team.

Professional career
Some of the clubs that Morgunov played with during his pro career included: CSKA Moscow (1995–97, 2000–02), Atletas Kaunas in Lithuania (1997–99), Avtodor Saratov (2002), Dynamo Moscow (2002–03, 2012–13), Dinamo Moscow Region (2004–07), Khimki (2007–08), Lokomotiv Kuban (2008–10), and Universitet Yugra Surgut (2010–11) in Russia, and Makedonikos Kozani in Greece (2003–04).

He was also under contract with the NBA team the Portland Trail Blazers, for three separate periods (January 26 - April 24, 1999; October 7, 1999 - April 14, 2000, and October 11–28, 2000), but he did not play in any regular season NBA games for the team.

On December 16, 2014, he signed with Dynamo Moscow of the Russian Super League.

Russian national team
Morgunov was also a member of the senior men's Russian national team that won the gold medal at the FIBA EuroBasket 2007. He also played at the 2000 Summer Olympic Games, and he won a silver medal at the 1998 FIBA World Championship.

References

External links
 Euroleague.net Profile
 Olympics Profile
 FIBA.com Profile (archive)
 Eurobasket.com Profile

1975 births
Living people
Basketball players at the 2000 Summer Olympics
Basketball players at the 2008 Summer Olympics
BC Avtodor Saratov players
BC Khimki players
BC Dynamo Moscow players
BC Zenit Saint Petersburg players
Russian expatriate basketball people in the United States
FIBA EuroBasket-winning players
Makedonikos B.C. players
Olympic basketball players of Russia
PBC CSKA Moscow players
PBC Lokomotiv-Kuban players
People from Novokuznetsk
Power forwards (basketball)
Russian men's basketball players
2002 FIBA World Championship players
1998 FIBA World Championship players
Sportspeople from Kemerovo Oblast